Consolidated Works was a "multi-disciplinary contemporary arts center" located successively in two former warehouses in the South Lake Union neighborhood  of Seattle, Washington, USA, just west of what would be considered the Cascade neighborhood within South Lake Union. It incorporated an art gallery, theater, cinema, and music/dance/lecture hall, as well as studio spaces for artists and a bar and lounge.

The center was founded in 1997 by Matthew Richter. Richter had previously worked at Seattle's alternative newspaper The Stranger as theatre editor. Funding came from grants, donations, and corporate sponsorship, and The Stranger also agreed to
provide advertising for events at ConWorks in exchange for storage space at its warehouse. Richter became the center's Executive Director, with Meg Shiffler becoming Director of Visual Art until 2003.

The center opened in 1999, working from temporary premises on Terry Avenue for three years. ConWorks' renovated facility at 500 Boren Avenue North opened on 13 September 2002. The refit of the  warehouse, built in 1948, cost almost half a million dollars.

Consolidated Works' aim was to give all the art forms equal billing - to be "neither a theater with art in the lobby nor a gallery with a stage in back; it is neither a cinema that plays music nor a music hall that shows films" . To this end, its presentations offered high-profile artists like Andy Warhol alongside emerging talent, primarily from the Pacific Northwest. This policy of encouraging young creative professionals also included an Artist-in-Residence program.

As well as mounting its own productions and exhibitions, the center also hosted touring events - for example, the Curiously Strong contemporary art program (sponsored by Altoids) and the popular 14/48 theater show (where 14 short plays are written and produced in 48 hours, begun in 1997). Richter's vision was one of experimentalism, and he argued that "if the quality of the programming was always of a strong finished caliber, then we weren't doing our job right" .

Restructuring in 2005

On February 8, 2005, the board of Consolidated Works dismissed Richter, the co-founder and executive director. The president of the board, Robb Krieg, did not reveal the reasons for the firing.

Richter's dismissal caused consternation in the Seattle arts community. A 36-signature petition was presented to the board, signed by senior figures in other local institutions, and all of ConWorks' creative staff resigned.

In September 2005 the board announced that Corey Pearlstein, a producer with a performing arts background had been named to the position. At the time of this writing, the company was preparing to open a major world premiere by Seattle-based, internationally known kinetic sculptor Trimpin.

From The Stranger, July 29: "[Conworks] announced that it would not renew its lease with Vulcan, Inc. because (a) the building requires seismic improvements and (b) Vulcan 'will require a nine-month exit clause to permit it to develop our South Lake Union lot if an opportunity arises.' ConWorks has begun looking for new accommodations."

Closure in 2006

On December 7, 2006, the Seattle Times reported that ConWorks would close by the end of the year.

References
Official site [defunct] States of the site from November 27, 1999, to October 4, 2006, are available on the Internet Archive.
'Explanations differ in firing at ConWorks', The Seattle Times, 10 March 2005
'Arts community rallies for Richter', Seattle Post-Intelligencer, 16 February 2005

External links
Consolidated Works: the Teardown Slog, November 10, 2008
Official site  [defunct]: States of the site from November 27, 1999, to October 4, 2006, are available on the Internet Archive.

1997 establishments in Washington (state)
2006 disestablishments in Washington (state)
Art galleries disestablished in 2006
Art galleries established in 1997
Art museums and galleries in Washington (state)
Buildings and structures in Seattle
Defunct art museums and galleries in the United States
Defunct museums in Washington (state)